Daniel Biro (born 1963 in Johannesburg, South Africa) is a London-based keyboard player, composer, sound-designer and producer. His music draws upon diverse roots in jazz, rock, minimalist, and electronic music. As an improvisor, Biro specializes in exploring the sonic depths of the Rhodes piano, with which he performs regularly.

Early life and education
Born in Johannesburg (South Africa), Biro spent his early years in Rome (Italy), London (UK), Milan (Italy) and Menton (France) where lived until the age of 22. He studied for 8 years at the Jazz Conservatory of Monaco under the direction of Roger Grosjean and, after completing a Literary Baccalauréat, three years at Nice University in France. He moved to London in 1985 where he's lived ever since.

Music
In the 1980s and 90s, Biro formed pop-rock bands such as the electro outfit IC and L'Orange with French vocalist songwriter Véronique Joly. He also toured worldwide as a keyboard player with Dennis Greaves' The Truth and EMI-signed Big Bam Boo. He has also been very much involved with contemporary dance, notably with choreographer Jane Turner with whom he has developed new real-time interactive dancers/musicians technologies based on Emergence Theory, where simple patterns generate complex results.

In 1993, Biro founded Sargasso Records to promote contemporary experimental music. Artists on the label include the late Jonathan Harvey, Lawrence Casserley, Violeta Dinescu, John McGuire, Simon Emmerson, John Palmer and more

He plays and records with his jazz/prog/psychedelic band Mysteries of the Revolution formed together with multi-instrumentalist Peter BB Davis as well as the ambient/jazz/electronic/improv Echo Engine with guitarist Rob Palmer, sound-designer Adrian Newton and various guest artists such as saxophonist/flautist Theo Travis.

As a singer-songwriter he has released the album 'Songs of Refuge' (Sargasso). In 2020 he released 'Still' an album of ambient songs in collaboration with prog band Camel's bass player and vocalist Colin Bass.

In 2021 Biro remastered and re-released digitally all his early albums. He also started a series of monthly livestream solo concerts called 'Synthrospections' from his home studio in London. These are totally improvised synth/keyboard sessions, using Biro's collection of vintage analog keyboards. Each concert is recorded then released as a digital album on Sargasso a few days later.

He is not the Daniel Biro from Hawk Nelson.

Film
He has written numerous soundtracks for TV documentaries by French director Olivier Sarrazin, experimental shorts and, in 2014, the award-winning 'Things of the Aimless Wanderer' by Rwandan director Kivu Ruhorahoza. The film was part of the official selection at the Sundance, Rotterdam, Durban, Sydney and London Film Africa festivals in 2015. In 2020 he composed music for the Channel 4/History Channel documentary 'Auschwitz Untold - In Color' directed by David Shulman as well as 'DeGaulle - Une Genèse Dans le Nord' documentary for French TV followed, in 2021 by BBC's 'Barack Obama Talks To David Olusoga' interview programme. Biro has also directed many videos and short films himself, often to accompany his music.

Selected works
Performed Compositions:
 Shir Hadash (2009) for 5 male voices, electric piano and electronics
 A Thin, Still Sound (2008) for bass clarinet and live electronics
 e-Merge (2004) for 5 voices and e-Merge computer system
 Black Fire On White Fire (2003) for amplified calligraphy, voice, 7 clarinets and electronics
 Re-sound (2000) for electric piano and tape
 Elegant Enigmas (1999) for harpsichord and electric piano
 Slow, Flow, Blow (1998) for 7 clarinets
 The Comparative Anatomy of Angels (1996) for 3 voices and tape
 Beba in White (1995) for 3 electric guitars and tape
 With These Gloves You Will Enter Mirrors Like Water (1995) for voice, string 4tet and synthesizer

For Contemporary Dance Performances:
 e-Merge
 Hybrid
 Desert
 Beauty And The Beast
 Soho Square
 A Still Point Of The Turning World

For Theatre:
 Membres Only
 HalfLife
 Dead Man's Coat
 Pedalo
 W.C.
 Firelines
 No Strings Attached
 The Woman Downstairs
 Horace
 3 Plays by Yeats

For Film:
 Things of the Aimless Wanderer
 Poolside
 The Incandescence Of One Man's Journey To Remain A Solid Object
 Carey Jones Architects
 4014
 Book of Dust
 Lessons in How to Wear Red
 Wrap Me In Film
 Death Leap
 Viva Il Reggimento

For Television:
 Barack Obama Talks To David Olusoga (BBC) - 2021
 DeGaulle - Une Genèse Dans le Nord (French TV)- 2020
 Auschwitz Untold - In Color (Channel 4 / History Channel) - 2020
 Carrément Cornichon (French TV) - 2012
 Rêves De Sable (French TV) 2011
 Bioattitude Sans Béatitude (French TV) - 2008
 Parce Que Vous Ne Valez Rien (French TV) - 2007
 Sous La Barbe De St Nicholas (French TV) - 2006
 In 2 Minds (BBC) - 2003

As Film Director:
Various music videos for himself and his band Mysteries of the Revolution
 Poolside – (2010)
 The Pinocchio Files – (2010)
 In Light (2009)
 O2:2:CO2 (Day, Night, People, River) – (2009)
 The Incandescence Of One Man's Journey To Remain A Solid Object – (2008)
 Carey Jones Architects – (2007)

Discography
 Longing For The Dawn (with Mysteries Of The Revolution) (2022) – Blue Serene Focus BSF1001/14
 Synthrospections (1,2,3 & 4) (2021) – Sargasso SCDB54014/SCDB54015/SCDB54016/SCDB54017
 Still (2020) – with Colin Bass – Sargasso SCDB54002
 I'll Be Here (with Echo Engine) (2019) – Blue Serene Focus BSF1001/13
 120 Onetwenty (2018) – Sargasso SCDB54001
 Things of the Aimless Wanderer (Film Soundtrack) (2015) – Sargasso 28080
 Windjammer (with Echo Engine) (2014) – Blue Serene Focus BSF1001/12
 You Turn Me On EP (with Mysteries Of The Revolution) (2014) – Blue Serene Focus BSF1001/11
 Shir Hadash – Sargasso SCD28076
 Songs Of Refuge (2012) – Sargasso SCD28069
 A Still, Thin Sound (2009) – Sargasso SCD28063
 Mysteries Of The Revolution (2007) – Blue Serene Focus BSF1001/10
 The Long Journey Home (with Rob Palmer) (2004) – Sargasso SCD28050
 2 People In A Room (with L'Orange) (2002) – Sargasso SSD39011
 Elegant Enigmas (1999) – Sargasso SCD28028
 The Comparative Anatomy Of Angels (1996) – Sargasso SCD28022
 Soho Square (1993) – Sargasso SCD28021

External links
 Official site
 Sargasso
 MOTR site
 Keyboard Production site
 

1963 births
French electronic musicians
Living people